Dryomyza is a genus of flies from the family Dryomyzidae. There are 11 known species of which 2 are fossils.

Species
D. amblia Kurahashi, 1981 
D. anilis Fallén, 1820 
D. badia Kurahashi, 1981 
D. caucasica Ozerov, 1987 
D. ecalcarata Kurahashi, 1981 
D. formosa (Wiedemann, 1830) 
D. pakistana Kurahashi, 1989 
†D. pelidua Statz, 1940 
D. puellaris Steyskal, 1957 
†D. shanwangensis Zhang, 1989 
D. simplex Loew, 1862 
D. takae Azuma, 2001

References

Dryomyzidae
Sciomyzoidea genera